Pontus Molander (born 13 March 1964) is a retired Swedish ice hockey player. Molander was part of the Djurgården Swedish champions' team of 1983. Molander made 67 Elitserien appearances for Djurgården.

References

Swedish ice hockey players
Djurgårdens IF Hockey players
1964 births
Living people